Bleeding Through is the sixth studio album by American metalcore band Bleeding Through. The album was released through Rise Records on April 13, 2010.

Background
The album is the first to be released by the band through Rise Records due to their shift to Rise after being very open and public about their dislike for Trustkill in 2008, Bleeding Through announced their split with the label shortly after releasing Declaration. In late 2009, the band announced their signing to Rise Records. Craig Ericson, President of Rise expressed his excitement to work with Bleeding Through stating, "We've been huge fans ever since they released an album on Indecision Records. Having Bleeding Through in the family is a dream come true. We both share extreme passion for music and can't wait to show the world what we can achieve together as a team." The band was mutually excited to work with Rise, due to the label's enthusiasm to help the band grow and reach their potential. Vocalist Brandan Schieppati stated, "After 10 years, we have been content with the fan base, the familiarity of touring and the comfort of knowing what to expect at every show. Rise wants to build on that."

Bleeding Through is also the first studio album to feature Dave Nassie, who has previously played in punk rock groups No Use for a Name,  22 Jacks, Suicidal Tendencies and the funk metal band Infectious Grooves. Nassie replaced former guitarist Jona Weinhofen, who left Bleeding Through after two years due to Trustkill not paying royalties and returned home to Australia.

Reception

Bleeding Through debuted at number 143 on the US Billboard 200 with 3,700 copies sold in the first week. This is significantly lower than Bleeding Through's previous album, 2008's Declaration, which peaked at number 101 and sold 6,000 copies in the first week.

Track listing
 "A Resurrection" – 1:54
 "Anti-Hero" – 3:09
 "Your Abandonment" – 3:30
 "Fifteen Minutes" – 3:48
 "Salvation Never Found" – 4:49
 "Breathing in the Wrath" – 4:29
 "This Time Nothing Is Sacred" – 3:16
 "Divide the Armies" – 4:50
 "Drag Me to the Ocean" – 3:51
 "Light My Eyes" – 2:42
 "Slow Your Roll" – 3:22
 "Distortion, Devotion" – 5:54

Personnel
Bleeding Through
 Brandan Schieppati – lead vocals
 Brian Leppke – guitars
 Dave Nassie – guitars
 Ryan Wombacher – bass, backing vocals
 Marta Peterson – keyboards, piano
 Derek Youngsma – drums, percussion

Production
 Chris "Zeuss" Harris – producer

References

External links
Track-by-track: Bleeding Through at Alternative Press

Bleeding Through albums
2010 albums
Rise Records albums
Albums produced by Chris "Zeuss" Harris